The Celtic League Cup is an ice hockey league contested by teams from both Scotland and Ireland. It was introduced in for the 2008/09 season with the purpose of raising the profile of the sport in Ireland and increasing interest in Scotland. Its teams also play in the Northern Premier League or the Irish Hockey League.

Current teams

 Dundee Stars
 Fife Flyers
 Paisley Pirates
 Solway Sharks

External links
 Official website

Ice hockey leagues in Scotland
Ice hockey competitions in Ireland
Multi-national ice hockey leagues in Europe
Multi-national professional sports leagues